The rufous-headed chachalaca (Ortalis erythroptera) is a species of bird in the family Cracidae, the chachalacas, guans, and curassows. It is found in Colombia, Ecuador, and Peru.

Taxonomy and systematics

The rufous-headed chachalaca is monotypic.

Description

It has a rufous head and neck and gray-brown back. The central tail feathers are dark gray and the outer ones gray near the body and chestnut on their outer halves. The lower breast and belly are creamy white. The primary flight feathers are bright chestnut. Its brown eye is surrounded by bare bluish gray skin. The legs are pale blue.

Distribution and habitat

The rufous-headed chachalaca is found in extreme southwestern Colombia, extreme northwestern Peru, and in several small to medium-sized areas in western Ecuador. It inhabits dry, but not arid, deciduous forest and cloudforest in the coastal zone and Andean foothills. There are unconfirmed reports from savannah and brushy habitats.

Behavior

Feeding

The rufous-headed chachalaca typically forages in groups of two to seven. Its known diet is only fruit but it may also include leaves.

Breeding

The rufous-headed chachalaca's breeding season appears to parallel the January to May rainy season. Captive birds lay clutches of three eggs.

Vocalization

The rufous-headed chachalaca is most vocal from before dawn into the early morning. Its principal call is a "raucous, repeated 'kwak-ar-ar-ar', 'cha-cha-kaw' or shriller 'kra-kra-kra'", and is usually initiated by the male. Pairs give several calls "including a soft cooing or clucking, [a] harsh 'cow', and [a] fast, repeated 'kawuck'."

Status

The IUCN has assessed the rufous-headed chachalaca as Vulnerable. Its range is fragmented and its population small and declining. Habitat destruction and hunting are the primary threats.

References

External links
BirdLife Species Factsheet.

rufous-headed chachalaca
Birds of Ecuador
Birds of the Tumbes-Chocó-Magdalena
rufous-headed chachalaca
rufous-headed chachalaca
rufous-headed chachalaca
Taxonomy articles created by Polbot